Ballard is a census-designated place in Santa Barbara County, California. The town of Ballard is one of the communities that make up the Santa Ynez Valley. The nearest city is Solvang. The population was 467 at the 2010 census. Ballard is the smallest and oldest community in the Santa Ynez Valley. The town history can be seen in two buildings from the 1880s: the 1883 Ballard School and the Santa Ynez Valley Presbyterian Church, which was erected in 1889. Ballard was founded in 1880.

History

Ballard was founded in 1880 at the location of a Wells Fargo stage line station, being named by George Lewis after William Ballard, the former proprietor, who ran the station from 1862 to 1870.  In 1882 it was believed that Ballard would grow into the central metropolis of Santa Barbara County. The first school, Ballard's Little Red School House, was built in 1882 and is still in operation today, being the primary tourist attraction in what turned out to be a tiny village, bypassed as a city.

Today, Ballard is a combination of sleepy village and upscale bedroom community. Noted for its excellent elementary school, it is a prized residential area. The surrounding area is noted for its thriving and well-respected wine industry. The wine-producing region around Ballard was featured in the Academy Award-nominated film Sideways. A world-renowned equine hospital is located nearby. The only commercial establishment currently operating in the main village is The Ballard Inn, a four-star restaurant and bed and breakfast inn in the heart of the village.  A recent addition, across the street form Ballard Inn, is now Bob's Well Bread Bakery, offering breakfast and lunch, as well as a multitude of artisan breads and pastries.

Geography
According to the United States Census Bureau, the CDP covers an area of 1.2 square miles (3.1 km2), 99.98% of it land, and 0.02% of it water.

Demographics

The 2010 United States Census reported that Ballard had a population of 467. The racial makeup of Ballard was 432 (92.5%) White, 3 (0.6%) African American, 1 (0.2%) Native American, 2 (0.4%) Asian, 0 (0.0%) Pacific Islander, 12 (2.6%) from other races, and 17 (3.6%) from two or more races. Hispanic or Latino of any race were 46 persons (9.9%).

The Census reported that 467 people (100% of the population) lived in households, 0 (0%) lived in non-institutionalized group quarters, and 0 (0%) were institutionalized.

There were 165 households, out of which 69 (41.8%) had children under the age of 18 living in them, 104 (63.0%) were opposite-sex married couples living together, 19 (11.5%) had a female householder with no husband present, 6 (3.6%) had a male householder with no wife present.  There were 8 (4.8%) unmarried opposite-sex partnerships, and 0 (0%) same-sex married couples or partnerships. 29 households (17.6%) were made up of individuals, and 11 (6.7%) had someone living alone who was 65 years of age or older. The average household size was 2.83.  There were 129 families (78.2% of all households); the average family size was 3.17.

The population was spread out, with 113 people (24.2%) under the age of 18, 45 people (9.6%) aged 18 to 24, 66 people (14.1%) aged 25 to 44, 178 people (38.1%) aged 45 to 64, and 65 people (13.9%) who were 65 years of age or older.  The median age was 45.7 years. For every 100 females, there were 89.1 males.  For every 100 females age 18 and over, there were 85.3 males.

The homeowner vacancy rate was 2.2%; the rental vacancy rate was 3.1%.  386 people (82.7% of the population) lived in owner-occupied housing units and 81 people (17.3%) lived in rental housing units.

References

Census-designated places in Santa Barbara County, California
Santa Ynez Valley
Census-designated places in California